Steve Desroches (born 1969) is a politician in Ottawa, Ontario, Canada.  He is a member of Ottawa City Council, representing Riverside South-Findlay Creek Ward since 2022. He was previously a member of Ottawa City Council from 2006 to 2014, representing for Gloucester-South Nepean Ward, a ward representing some of Ottawa's southern suburbs. He was first elected in the 2006 municipal election, and was re-elected in the 2010 municipal election.

Desroches studied at the University of Ottawa and Carleton University, where he obtained a Master's degree in public administration. Prior to his entry in municipal politics, Desroches worked for several Ministries in the federal government as well as the office of the Auditor General.  He was a trustee at the Ottawa Public Library Board and also a vice-chair in the OC Transpo Advisory Committee. He was also the vice-present of the Riverside South Community Association.  At the time of the 2006 election, he was employed by the Department of Agriculture.

In the 2006 election, Desroches defeated former Ottawa-Carleton Regional Chair Andrew Haydon to become the first councillor of this new ward which included about half of Barrhaven, Riverside South and Findlay Creek.

He listed his priorities as to improving infrastructures in the ward that is under massive development, including improving roads and public transit. Public Safety and fiscal management were also key priorities in his campaign and for his upcoming term at City Council.  He was also a supporter of the now-cancelled expansion of the City's O-Train north-south light-rail expansion project which would have served Riverside South and Barrhaven South starting in 2009.

Desroches was easily re-elected in 2010, and served until 2014, as he had promised to only serve for two terms.

Following his time on council, Desroches became a member of the Board of Directors of the Perley-Rideau Veterans Health Centre Foundation. In 2015 he was awarded the Minister of Veterans Affairs Commendation for his work to support Canadian veterans. Desroches expressed interest in running for the Conservative Party of Canada in the 2015 Canadian federal election, but ultimately did not. He had also been touted as a potential candidate for the Liberals, but considered his personal politics to be "conservative", due to his economic views.

On May 18, 2022 Desroches announced he would be running for city council once again in the 2022 Ottawa municipal election. He ran in Riverside South-Findlay Creek Ward, a re-drawn version of his old ward.

Electoral record

|-
! rowspan="2" colspan="2"|Candidate
! colspan="3"|Popular vote
! rowspan="2" colspan="2"|Expenditures
|-
! Votes
! %
! ±%
|-
| style="background-color:#f3cf17;" |
| style="text-align:left;"  | Steve Desroches
| style="text-align:right;" | 5,682
| style="text-align:right;" | 67.89
| style="text-align:right;" |
| style="text-align:right;" |
|-
| style="background-color:#1e2025;" |
| style="text-align:left;"  | Zainab Alsalihiy
| style="text-align:right;" | 1,533
| style="text-align:right;" | 18.32
| style="text-align:right;" |
| style="text-align:right;" |
|-
| style="background-color:#2f3192;" |
| style="text-align:left;"  | Salah Elsaadi
| style="text-align:right;" | 900
| style="text-align:right;" | 10.75
| style="text-align:right;" |
| style="text-align:right;" |
|-
| style="background-color:#FFFFFF;" |
| style="text-align:left;"  | Em McLellan
| style="text-align:right;" | 255
| style="text-align:right;" | 3.05
| style="text-align:right;" |
| style="text-align:right;" |
|-
| style="text-align:right;background-color:#FFFFFF;" colspan="2" |Total valid votes
| style="text-align:right;background-color:#FFFFFF;" | 8,370
| style="text-align:right;background-color:#FFFFFF;" | 98.47
| style="text-align:right;background-color:#c2c2c2;" colspan="2" |
|-
| style="text-align:right;background-color:#FFFFFF;" colspan="2" |Total rejected, unmarked and declined votes
| style="text-align:right;background-color:#FFFFFF;" | 130
| style="text-align:right;background-color:#FFFFFF;" | 1.53
| style="text-align:right;background-color:#c2c2c2;" colspan="2" |
|-
| style="text-align:right;background-color:#FFFFFF;" colspan="2" |Turnout
| style="text-align:right;background-color:#FFFFFF;" | 8,500
| style="text-align:right;background-color:#FFFFFF;" | 42.88
| style="text-align:right;background-color:#FFFFFF;" | -3.21
| style="text-align:right;background-color:#c2c2c2;" |
|-
| style="text-align:right;background-color:#FFFFFF;" colspan="2" |Eligible voters
| style="text-align:right;background-color:#FFFFFF;" | 19,822
| style="text-align:right;background-color:#c2c2c2;" colspan="3" |
|-
| style="text-align:left;" colspan="6" |Note: Candidate campaign colours are based on the prominent colour used in campaign items (signs, literature, etc.)and are used as a visual differentiation between candidates.
|-
| style="text-align:left;" colspan="13" |Sources:
|}

References

External links
 Official Website

Living people
Ottawa city councillors
Desroches,Steve
University of Ottawa alumni
1969 births
21st-century Canadian civil servants
Ontario civil servants